Wijemuni Vijitha Rohana de Silva (born 1965) is a former Sri Lankan navy sailor and an astrologer. He is noted for his assault on Indian Prime Minister Rajiv Gandhi on 30 July 1987 at President's House, Colombo. It was claimed by some as an attempted assassination. He later contested a general election under the Sihala Urumaya party in 2000.

Early life and naval career
Born in Boossa, Ratgama in the southern province of Sri Lanka; he studied at Gintota Maha Vidyalaya and passed the O Level examination. Thereafter he joined the Sri Lanka Navy received his weapons training at the Naval and Maritime Academy and specialized as a radiomen. He was stationed at SLNS Elara in Karainagar, Jaffna taking part in the Vadamarachchi Operation. In July 1987 he was a Leading Rate and transferred the Colombo and assigned to the Guard of honour for the visiting Indian Prime Minister, who was in Colombo to sign the Indo-Sri Lanka Accord that would result in the deployment of the Indian Peace Keeping Force.

Assault
Rohana was enraged by the Indian support for the Liberation Tigers of Tamil Eelam and its direct interference in Sri Lanka with Operation Poomalai and forcing the conclusion of the successful Vadamarachchi Operation before all its objectives were met. These were sentiments felt throughout the country and continues to this day.

The Guard of Honour was commanded by Lieutenant Mendis who invited the Indian Prime Minister to review the guard as per tradition. Rajiv Gandhi was escorted by Lieutenant Mendis along with Sri Lankan Finance Minister Ronnie de Mel, and Sri Lankan security personnel. Vijitha Rohana swung his ceremonial Lee–Enfield rifle at the Indian Prime Minister aiming at the back of his neck. Gandhi managed to duck and miss the full brunt of the blow, even though the rifle struck him. Rohana was quickly restrained by Lieutenant Mendis and the Chief Petty Officer of the detachment along with other security personnel and Sri Lankan police.

Court martial
Vijitha Rohana faced a court martial headed by Commodore K.R.L. Perera, Group Captain Buddhi Siriwardhen and Colonel Vijaya Wimalaratne. He was charged with attempted murder and acting contrary to navy discipline and insulting a state leader. Prosecuted by Senior State Counsel Captain Raja Fernando, his defence team included Sarath Wijesinghe, Susil Premajayantha and Donald Hewagama. The defence implied that Rohana was not aiming to kill since he could have stabbed the premier with the bayonet affixed to his Lee–Enfield rifle at the time. The court martial found him guilty of attempted culpable homicide not amounting to murder and insulting the Indian Prime Minister. He was sentenced to six years in prison, however President Ranasinghe Premadasa gave him a presidential pardon after two and a half years.

Later life
After his release from prison he gained a degree from the University of Sri Jayewardenepura and started his own business. In 2000 he contested the general election under the Sihala Urumaya party.

He later became an astrologer and claimed that President Maithripala Sirisena would die by 26 January 2017. This was seen as a part of a conspiracy to assassinate the president and he was arrested again.

Further reading

See also
List of assassination attempts on prime ministers of India
Indo-Sri Lanka Accord
Vadamarachchi Operation
Operation Poomalai

References

External links

Rajiv Gandhi escapes an attempt on his life by a Sri Lankan Naval Cadet. Wilderness Films India Ltd.
Interview With Sri Lankan Soldier Who Hit Former Prime Minister Rajiv Gandhi. Thanthi TV.
The soldier who hit Rajiv Gandhi does not regret his act. ABP News.

1965 births
Living people
Sinhalese politicians
Sri Lanka Navy sailors
People who were court-martialed
Alumni of the University of Sri Jayewardenepura
Sri Lankan assassins
Failed assassination attempts in Sri Lanka
Failed assassins
Assassination of Rajiv Gandhi
Filmed assassinations
Failed assassination attempts in Asia
Assassinations in India